Nad jazerom, officially Košice – mestská časť Nad jazerom, shortened to Košice-Nad jazerom (literally: "Košice – borough Above the Lake") is a borough (city ward) of Košice, Slovakia. The name of the borough is derived from a water reservoir called Jazero, which was originally excavated for the extraction of gravel.

History 
The locality that became the borough of Nad jazerom first appeared in written records in 1275.

Nad jazerom began as a borough of Košice in the late 1960s, particularly with the development of the local housing estates.

Statistics

 Area: 
 Population: 24,803 (31 December 2017) 
 Density of population: 6,800/km2 (31 December 2017) 
 District: Košice IV
 Mayor: Lenka Kovačevičová (as of 2018 elections)

Gallery

References

External links

 Official website of the Nad jazerom borough
 Article on the Nad jazerom borough at Cassovia.sk
 Official website of Košice

Boroughs of Košice